The Guyana national rugby union team represents Guyana in the sport of rugby union. They have thus far not qualified for a Rugby World Cup, but have participated in qualifying tournaments.

History
Guyana made their international debut in Georgetown in 1979 in a match against Bermuda, which Bermuda won. They played Bermuda again in 1981 in the Port of Spain. The team got their first win in 1999 in Georgetown, defeating Martinique seven points to three. The team competed in the Americas qualifying tournaments for qualification for the 2003 Rugby World Cup in Australia, including fixtures against Cayman Islands.

Guyana competes in the Caribbean Championship, a tournament which includes Antigua, Trinidad and Tobago, the Cayman Islands, Jamaica, the Bahamas, British Virgin Islands, and Bermuda.

Guyana attempted to qualify for the 2007 Rugby World Cup in France in 2005, contesting the Americas tournament in Round 1a. Guyana were grouped in the South Pool, alongside Barbados, Trinidad and Tobago and Saint Lucia. Guyana won two of their three fixtures, finishing in second place in the final standings.

In 2003, Guyana's u-18 team won the Caribbean championship and went on to win it the following two years, losing it to Jamaica on points in Guyana in 2006 and losing in the final of the u-20 World Cup qualifier in the Cayman Islands 2007 to Jamaica, who won on drop goals after the match went tied after extra time.

Guyana will participate in the 2010 Commonwealth Games in Delhi, having won the NACRA qualifying tournament in Mexico in November 2009. The side was captained by Claudius Butts, with Theodore Henry taking over when Butts was injured in the buildup to Mexico.

The side are currently coached by Larry Adonis and Clinton Clarke, with West Indies coach Joe Whipple acting as a technical director.

The team is sponsored by X-Treme Rugby ( www.x-tremerugbywear.com)  a Thailand-based company owned by former Canadian International player (50 caps), Eddie Evans. Eddie also runs charity called Nakk Suu, designed to help teach the game of rugby to kids in Thailand.

Guyanese rugby is regularly supported by the BOOST Coaching Programme based at Loughborough University, U.K, with 2 coaches travelling to spend a month with the union once a year. One coach then comes to Loughborough in return, normally in February or March.

Results

NACRA / Rugby Americas North Championship
 Champions in 1966 and 2014.
 Runner-ups in 2008, 2011, 2012, 2016 and 2017.

Squad
Guyana squad at the 2015 NACRA Rugby Championship:

Officials
Kenneth Grant-Stuart - Coach 
Robin Roberts - Manager 
Abiola Blair - Physiotherapist

Previous Squads

See also
 Rugby union in Guyana

References

External links
 Guyana on IRB.com
 Guyana on RugbyData.com

South American national rugby union teams
Rugby union in Guyana
Rugby union
1979 establishments in Guyana
Rugby clubs established in 1979